The Płock refinery is a large oil refinery and petrochemical complex located in Płock, Poland. It is owned by PKN Orlen. The refinery has a Nelson complexity index of 9.5 and a capacity is 276 kbpd of crude oil.

See also
Petroleum
List of oil refineries

Refinery
Energy in Poland
Oil refineries in Poland